Bargemusic, formally known as Bargemusic, Ltd. is a classical music venue and cultural icon in Brooklyn.  Founded in 1977, it is housed on a converted coffee barge moored at Fulton Ferry Landing on the East River near the Brooklyn Bridge.

History
Olga Bloom founded Bargemusic in 1977, following the transformation of the coffee barge into a music hall in that same year, and the programming has evolved over time while not losing the intimacy of the performance space, which some compare to a floating living room. The barge itself dates to 1899.

"Actually, we're practicing great economy of motion here," said Bloom in 1990.  "Water exerts a universal pull on humanity. People commune with nature here, to a degree. They even see a soaring seagull occasionally, and I have my scraggly, brave pines on the deck. We also offer an unmistakably warm social occasion. Our audiences are small - we can hold 140, but I usually try to cut off at 130 - so even though they don't know each other, they speak to each other readily during the intermissions. They are sharing values. And they are experiencing a noble performance of great music. All in one visit."

The current barge, 102-feet long and built in 1899, was the third that Bloom purchased for this use after the first two barges' acoustics did not suit concert performances. She found the current barge near the Statue of Liberty and a tugboat captain advised her of the free slip near the Brooklyn Bridge that still houses the barge.

In 2003, a mishap with a pipe nearly caused the barge to sink.  It took hundreds of gallons of water into its bilge when a pipe feeding water into it snapped due to freezing weather.  Listing, it began taking on seawater through a crack in its side.  A repair crew pumped more than 1,500 gallons of water out of the bilge before it started to level.

Despite some uncertainties as to their location with all the redevelopment in Brooklyn Bridge Park and DUMBO, including the new NYC Ferry service, Bargemusic received word in June 2017 that their bid for a twenty-year lease was approved.

Bargemusic has been led by Mark Peskanov as executive and artistic director since 2006 and as of 2010 produced more than 200 concerts each year.

Funding
Like many organizations in Lower Manhattan and throughout New York City, Bargemusic's attendance suffered after 9/11 and that caused questions about its continued existence. To make money, Bloom and Bargemusic have rented the barge out for weddings and solicited donations from foundations, corporations, and individuals. Some believe that if Bargemusic were given landmark status, it would help secure the necessary corporate sponsorship to ensure the program's continued success.

References

External links
 

Concert halls in New York City
Music venues in Brooklyn